Jung District (Jung-gu) is the historic central ward of the city of Incheon, South Korea, one of the eight wards into which Incheon is divided. Its name means "central" in Korean. It was founded in 1883 on the opening of the Jemulpo Port and contains several historical and cultural heritage monuments, such as Dap-dong Cathedral, Hongyemun Gate, The First Anglican Church, and Jayu Park, Korea's first modern park.

Incheon is the gateway to Seoul, the capital of South Korea. In modern times it became a trading port, eventually growing to become the second-largest port in South Korea. It is also contains Incheon International Airport.

Administrative Divisions

Old downtown area 
Sinpo-dong (divided in turn into Jungang-dong 1 to 4 Ga, Haean-dong 1 to 4 Ga, Gwandong 1 to 3 Ga, Songhak-dong 1 to 3 Ga, Sadong, Sinsaeng-dong, Dapdong, Sinpo-dong, Hangdong 1 to 6 Ga and some portion of Hangdong 7-ga)
Yeonan-dong (divided in turn into some portions of Hangdong 7-ga and Bukseong-dong 1-ga)
 Gaehang-dong
Bukseong-dong (divided in turn into Bukseong-dong 2 and 3 Ga, some portion of Bukseong-dong 1-ga and Seollin-dong)
Songwol-dong 1 to 3 Ga
Sinheung-dong (divided in turn into Sinheung-dong 1 to 3 Ga and Seonhwa-dong)
Yulmok-dong (divided in turn into Yulmok-dong and Yudong)
Dong Incheon-dong (divided in turn into Nae-dong, Gyeong-dong, Yong-dong, Inhyeon-dong, and Jeon-dong)
Dowon-dong

Yeongjong-Yongyu 
Yeongjong-dong, Yeongjong Island (divided in turn into Jungsan-dong, Unnam-dong and Unbuk-dong)
Unseo-dong, Yeongjong Island
Yongyu-dong, Yongyu Island (divided in turn into Eurwang-dong, Nambuk-dong, Deokgyo-dong and Muui-dong)

Administrative reform 
In 1989, Yeongjong-Yongyu was transferred to Jung District. Yeongjong-Yongyu suffered rapid population growth due to the development of Incheon International Airport but old downtown area of Incheon suffered rapid population decline. Therefore many residents Yeongjong-Yongyu demanded that Yeongjong-Yongyu should be a district of Incheon and old downtown area of Jung District, Incheon should be merged with Dong District, Incheon. In 2022, Yeongjong-Yongyu's Korean national population exceeded 100 thousands and  old downtown area of Jung and Dong Districts.

On August 31, 2022. Yoo Jeong-bok who is a Mayor of Incheon officialized this proposal to a city policy. Old downtown area of Jung District and Dong District will be merged into Jemulpo District and Yeongjong-Yongyu will be an independent Yeongjong District. Two mayors of effected districts agreed this proposal.

Education
International schools:
 Overseas Chinese Primary and Middle/High School, Incheon (인천화교소·중산중고등학교)

Tourist attractions
Jajangmyeon Museum is a museum about Jajangmyeon noodle.

Incident

References

External links
Jung-gu homepage 

 
Districts of Incheon